The Philippines has participated at the Universiade debuting at the 1967 Summer Universiade. From 1967 until 2007, athletes representing the country were sent by the University Athletic Association of the Philippines with sanction from Philippine Olympic Committee. Since 2011 it is the Federation of School Sports Association of the Philippines (FESSAP), a member of the International University Sports Federation (FISU), that has been sending competitors representing the country at the Universiade.

History
The Philippines first participated in the Universiade at the 1967 Summer Universiade in Tokyo. From 1967 until 2007, the University Athletic Association of the Philippines sent athletes to the Universiade under the directive of the Philippine Olympic Committee. 

From the 2011 edition, the Philippine delegation has been sanctioned and sent by the Federation of School Sports Association of the Philippines which was granted membership by the International University Sports Federation (FISU) in 2009. The UAAP attempted to gain membership at the FISU and replace FESSAP as the Philippines' member organization in the international sports body, but FISU affirmed the membership of FESSAP in 2013.

The Philippines won its first gold medal at the 2013 Summer Universiade courtesy of Wesley So of chess.

The country made its debut in the Winter Universiade in the 2019 edition held in Krasnoyarsk, Russia. The Philippines competed in figure skating with Misha Fabian as the national delegation's sole competitor.

Team sports
The Philippines has sent athletes to compete in team sports such as basketball and volleyball. These teams are not necessarily organized or sanctioned by member associations of the Philippine Olympic Committee.

Basketball
The Philippines' last participation in the Universiade in the 20th century was in 1967 Summer Universiade when the UE Red Warriors of the University of the East played as the country's Universiade basketball team. The UE team was led by Robert Jaworski and Danny Florencio. The team placed fifth out of eight teams in the final standing.

The Philippine Olympic Committee and the Samahang Basketbol ng Pilipinas attempted to send a men's basketball team to the 2009 Summer Universiade. Their application to FISU was denied, saying to the POC that they are prioritizing participation of its member associations for the 24-team men's basketball event. 2008 Philippine Collegiate Champion League winners, the De La Salle Green Archers of the De La Salle University, would have represented the country.

The first basketball team sent by the Federation of School Sports Association of the Philippines as the Philippines' representatives were the University of the Visayas Lancers, who played in the 2013 edition. This team was led by head coach Felix Bellano Jr. However, the team was disqualified after they left the tournament before the quarterfinals.

Volleyball
When the Philippines debuted at the 1967 Summer Universiade, they fielded volleyball teams for both the men's and women's competition. The men's team finished fourth while the women's team clinched second place.

Medal count

Medals by Summer Universiade

Medals by sport

Medals at the Winter Universiade

List of medalists

See also
Philippines at the Olympics

References
 

 
Nations at the Universiade
Universiade